"Crimson Climax"  (Japanese: 螢子 - "Hotaruko" / Firefly") is a hentai genre animation movie released in 2003. Contains thriller, horror and erotica.

Premiere
It was released as a three-part series of films, and later merged and released as a video film.

Plot
Ryo is a young girl and her mother has died. He returns to his family's home on the island. There he begins to think about his mother's strange behavior in the past. Strange things begin to happen when he meets his cousin, Hotaruko. The past of the island and the girl are mysterious and dark.

References

External links
 

2003 films